The University of Santo Tomas Singers or UST Singers is the premiere mixed choral ensemble of Asia's oldest university, the University of Santo Tomas. It was founded in 1992 by Prof. Fidel Calalang Jr. and is composed of students and alumni from the different colleges of the university.

Discography

Awards

References
 Official Facebook page
  
 choir-days

University of Santo Tomas
University choirs
Filipino choirs
Musical groups from Metro Manila
Musical groups established in 1992